Something's Coming: The BBC Recordings 1969–1970 is a compilation of live recordings by the progressive rock band, Yes. They are the only live recordings to feature the band's original lineup. It is a compilation of the band's early performances on BBC Radio featuring tracks taken mainly from their first two albums. However, it did feature two rarities: the title track Something's Coming from the musical West Side Story had previously only been released as the "b" side to the 1969 single "Sweetness" and the track "For Everyone" which has not been released in any other version.

The two-disc set features liner notes by original guitarist Peter Banks, who was fired from the band shortly after these recordings were made. The album was released in 1997, with supervision and notes by Banks. The US edition (licensed by Purple Pyramid, Cleopatra Records) is titled Beyond and Before: The BBC Recordings 1969–1970. There was also a European release on "Double Classics" simply entitled "Something's Coming".

Track listing

Personnel 
 Jon Anderson – vocals
 Peter Banks – guitars, vocals
 Chris Squire – bass, vocals
 Tony Kaye – Hammond organ, piano
 Bill Bruford – drums

References

External links
Yescography

BBC Radio recordings
Yes (band) live albums
1997 live albums
1997 compilation albums